Massachusetts Senate's Cape and Islands district in the United States is one of 40 legislative districts of the Massachusetts Senate. It covers 66.7% of Barnstable County, all of Dukes County, and all of Nantucket County population in 2010. Democrat Julian Cyr of Truro has represented the district since 2017. He is running unopposed for re-election in the 2020 Massachusetts general election.

Towns represented
The district includes the following localities:
 Aquinnah
 Barnstable
 Brewster
 Chatham
 Chilmark
 Dennis
 Eastham
 Edgartown
 Gosnold
 Harwich
 Mashpee
 Nantucket
 Oak Bluffs
 Orleans
 Provincetown
 Tisbury
 Truro
 Wellfleet
 West Tisbury
 Yarmouth

The current district geographic boundary overlaps with those of the Massachusetts House of Representatives' 1st Barnstable, 2nd Barnstable, 3rd Barnstable, 4th Barnstable, 5th Barnstable, and Barnstable, Dukes & Nantucket districts.

List of senators

See also
 List of Massachusetts Senate elections
 List of Massachusetts General Courts
 List of former districts of the Massachusetts Senate

References

External links
 Ballotpedia
  (State Senate district information based on U.S. Census Bureau's American Community Survey).
 
 League of Women Voters of the Cape Cod Area
 League of Women Voters Martha’s Vineyard

Senate 
Government of Barnstable County, Massachusetts
Dukes County, Massachusetts
Nantucket, Massachusetts
Massachusetts Senate